The 1947 World Table Tennis Championships women's doubles was the 13th edition of the women's doubles championship.
Gizi Farkas and Gertrude Pritzi defeated Mae Clouther and Reba Monness in the final by three sets to nil.

Results

See also
List of World Table Tennis Championships medalists

References

-
-